The 2021 Úrvalsdeild karla, also known as Pepsi Max deild karla for sponsorship reasons, was the 110th season of top-flight Icelandic football. Twelve teams contested the league, including the defending champions Valur, who won their 23rd league title in 2020.

Teams

The 2021 Úrvalsdeild was contested by twelve teams, ten of which played in the division the previous year and two teams promoted from 1. deild karla. The bottom two teams from the previous season, Grótta and Fjölnir (both relegated after one year in the top flight), were relegated to the 2021 1. deild karla and were replaced by Keflavík (promoted after a two-year absence) and Leiknir (promoted after a five-year absence), champions and runners-up of the 2020 1. deild karla respectively.

Club information

Personnel and kits

League table

Fixtures and results
Each team was originally scheduled to play home and away once against every other team for a total of 22 games each.

Top goalscorers

References

External links
  

Úrvalsdeild karla (football) seasons
1
Iceland
Iceland